Neopseustis meyricki is a species of moth belonging to the family Neopseustidae. It was described by Hering in 1925. It is known from the central highlands of Taiwan, where it occurs rather widely at elevations exceeding 1,000 meters.

The wingspan is 20 mm for males and 20–22 mm for females.

References

Neopseustidae